Cairbre (Cairpre, Coirpre) is a popular medieval Irish name borne by several historical and mythological figures, including:
 Cairbre, son of Ogma, poet and satirist of the Tuatha Dé Danann
 Cairbre Nia Fer, legendary king of Tara
 Cairbre Cuanach, legendary Ulster warrior
 Cairbre Cinnchait, legendary 1st-century usurper High King of Ireland
 Cairbre Lifechair, 3rd-century High King of Ireland
 Coirpre mac Néill, son of Niall of the Nine Hostages, eponymous founder of the Cenél Coirpri who also gave his name to the barony of Carbury, County Kildare
 Three sons of Conaire Cóem: Cairpre Músc, Cairpre Baschaín, and Cairpre Riata
 Coirpre Cromm mac Crimthainn, Munster king

Places
 Carbery (disambiguation), anglicised spelling of places named Cairbre or similar in Irish